Zhapu, alternately romanized as Chapoo or Chapu, is a town under the administration of Pinghu, in the north of Zhejiang Province, China. It is located along the northern shore of Hangzhou Bay in the southeastern part of Pinghu and borders Haiyan County to its south and southeast. The town covers an area of 54.4 square kilometers and has a population of 54,000.

History
Zhapu is the site of a deepwater harbor on the northern shore of Hangzhou Bay, noted as a port since the Tang. Under the Qing, an extensive canal network connected it to Hangzhou and turned it into the area's principal port. Under the dynasty's restrictive trade policies, its merchants monopolized China's trade with Korea and Japan.

The British captured the town on 18May 1842 but abandoned it shortly thereafter. By that time, the harbor had begun silting up and was only accessible to the lighter-draft British vessels. It was omitted from the treaty ports at the end of the war and declined in importance relative to nearby Shanghai and Ningbo.

By the early 20th century, its harbor had effectively silted up and the town became a backwater.

Zhapu Port

Zhapu port, located south of the mouth of Yangtze river is a new port developed after 2000, and is a part of the port of Jiaxing. It is located in Hangzhou bay, equidistant from Ningbo, Hangzhou and Huzhou.

Notes

References 
 
 

Jiaxing
Port cities and towns in China
China–Korea relations
China–Japan relations
Towns of Zhejiang